This is a list of any museum and art gallery in Montevideo, Uruguay.

Biographical, City, Ethnographic, and History museums, and Historic Houses
Archivo de la Ciudad
Museo del Arma de Ingenieros “Aduana de Oribe”
Museo y Archivo Histórico Municipal - Cabildo
Casa de Gobierno “Palacio Estevez”
Museo Histórico Nacional
Casa del Gral. Fructuoso Rivera
Casa del Gral. Juan Antonio Lavalleja
Casa de Antonio Montero (see Museo Romántico)
Casa de Juan Francisco Giró
Casa de José Garibaldi
Casa de Manuel Ximénez y Gómez
Casa Quinta del Dr. Luis Alberto de Herrera
Casa Quinta de José Batlle y Ordoñez
Casa de Juan Zorrilla de San Martín (see Museo Juan Zorrilla de San Martín)
Museo de Artes Decorativas (Palacio Taranco)

Museo Juan Zorrilla de San Martín (House museum and art gallery)
Museo Romántico (Casa de Antonio Montero)
Museo del Descubrimiento-Apostadero Naval Español
Centro Cultural y Museo de la Memoria
Recordatorio del Holocausto

Folklore, Folk art
Museo del Carnaval
Museo del Gaucho

Art, Culture, Music, and Photography museums

Centro de Fotografía de Montevideo
Museo de Arte Contemporáneo
Museo de Historia del Arte y de Arte Precolombino y Colonial (MuHAr)
Museo de Arte Precolombino e Indígena (Mapi)
Museo Nacional de Artes Visuales
Museo Juan Manuel Blanes
Museo del Azulejo
Museo Egipcio
Museo Figari
Museo Gurvich
Museo Joaquín Torres García
Museo Virtual de Artes El País
Carnival Museum
Vilamajó House Museum

Art Galleries and exhibition rooms
Espacio de Arte Contemporáneo
Sala de Arte "Carlos Federico Sáez"
Centro Cultural AGADU
Centro Cultural España
Centro de Fotografía de Montevideo (CdF)
Centro Municipal de Exposiciones "Subte"
Sala Zitarrosa
Museo de las Migraciones

Industry, Maritime, Military, Railway, Science, Technology, Transport
Museo Aeronáutico
Museo del Automóvil Eduardo Iglesias
Museo "Blandengues de Artigas"
Museo Estación Peñarol
Museo y Parque Fernando García
Museo Militar Fortaleza General Artigas
Museo Naval de Montevideo
Museo Viviente de la Radio y las Comunicaciones
Planetrium of Montevideo

Anthropology, Natural History, Geology, Paleontology
Museo de Geología del Uruguay
Museo Nacional de Historia Natural
Museo Nacional de Antropología
Museo Marítimo Ecológico de Malvín
Museo Zoológico Dámaso Antonio Larrañaga

Children, Education, Special Interests, Sports, University
Museo del Fútbol del Uruguay (Centenario stadium)
Museo Pedagógico "José Pedro Varela"
Museo de la Moneda del Banco República
Numismatic Museum

References

External links

Montevideo